ISDA may refer to:
 Independence of Smith-dominated alternatives, a voting system criterion.
 Indian Self-Determination and Education Assistance Act of 1975, a United States law
 Industrial Designers Society of America
 International Semiconductor Development Alliance, technology alliance between IBM, AMD/GlobalFoundries, Freescale, Infineon, NEC, Samsung, STMicroelectronics and Toshiba.
 International Swaps and Derivatives Association, trade organization of participants in the market for over-the-counter derivatives
 Irish Student Drama Association, association for intercollegiate competition in Irish amateur student theatre